A botijo, also called búcaro, is a traditional porous clay container designed to contain water. The botijo is a typical element of Spanish culture and may vary in shape, color and material. The botijo has the property that once filled, it cools the water that it contains, acting as an evaporative cooler.

The botijo has a wide belly and one or more mouths where it is filled and one or more outputs called pitón or pitorro to drink from. 

The búcaro de Indias is a special type, made of fragrant clay from Mexico, that was prized in Europe.

Operation 

The operating principle of the botijo is as follows: the stored water is filtered through the pores of the clay and in contact with the outside dry environment (characteristic of Mediterranean climate), it evaporates, producing a cooling (2.219 kilojoules per gram of evaporated water). The key for cooling it, is by the evaporation of bleed water, as the water evaporates, it extracts thermal energy from the water stored inside the jug.

See also
 Porron - another distinctively Hispanic vessel

Notes

External links 

Containers
Spanish culture
Catalan culture